Hassan Lingani (born 30 December 1987) is an Ivorian professional footballer who plays as a defender for French team AS Muret.

Career
Born in Abobo-Doumé, Lingani began his career with AS Athlétic d'Adjamé, playing alongside Seydou Doumbia and Thierry Doubai. The three players were the biggest talents in the academy. After few years with Athlétic, he joined the French lower league club US Albi in July 2007. He played until the summer of 2009, and he signed for SC Bastia. On 31 December 2009, he left Ligue 2 and his club SC Bastia, for which he played eight games in the first half of the 2009–10 season, to join Swiss club Young Boys Bern.

Personal life
His half-brother, Issoumaila Dao, is also a professional footballer.

References

External links
 

1987 births
Living people
Ivorian Muslims
Footballers from Abidjan
Association football defenders
Ivorian footballers
Ligue 2 players
Championnat National players
Championnat National 2 players
Championnat National 3 players
US Albi players
SC Bastia players
BSC Young Boys players
AS Illzach Modenheim players
USL Dunkerque players
AS Béziers (2007) players
AS Muret players
Ivorian expatriate footballers
Ivorian expatriate sportspeople in France
Expatriate footballers in France